The table below lists the judgments of the Constitutional Court of South Africa delivered in 2021.

The members of the court at the start of 2021 were Chief Justice Mogoeng Mogoeng, Deputy Chief Justice Raymond Zondo, and judges Chris Jafta, Sisi Khampepe, Mbuyiseli Madlanga, Steven Majiedt, Nonkosi Mhlantla, Leona Theron and Zukisa Tshiqi. At the start of the year there were two vacancies, and three more were created when Chief Justice Mogoeng Mogoeng retired with effect from 11 October, and Justices Sisi Khampepe and Chris Jafta retired with effect from November.

References
 

2021
Constitutional Court